LGD may refer to:

 Loss given default
 La Grande/Union County Airport, Oregon, US, FAA identifier 
 Livestock guardian dog
 Lab-grown diamond